Gordon William Kennett (born 2 September 1953) is a former motorcycle speedway rider. In 1978 he won the World Pairs Championship with Malcolm Simmons. He also finished runner-up to Ole Olsen in the 1978 Speedway World Championship at Wembley. 

Gordon's career spanned twenty four years including spells with Oxford Rebels, and moved with them to form the White City Rebels and then a return to Eastbourne Eagles. With Oxford he was a member of the Midland Cup winning team (1975) in a dramatic competition that saw home and away draws with Swindon Robins requiring reruns and a home and away victory over Wolverhampton Wolves to secure the trophy. In 1977, he rode with the White City Rebels to top the British League Tables.

Since retiring in 1995, he worked as a car mechanic and was not involved with speedway, although he would watch matches and support family members.

Gordon lives in Brighton with his wife, Susan.

Family
Brothers Dave and Brian (Barney) also rode and currently his nephew Edward Kennett, son of Dave, rode for the Rye House Rockets and has represented Great Britain in the Speedway World Cup.

World Final Appearances

Individual World Championship
 1978 -  - London, Wembley Stadium - 2nd - 12pts

World Pairs Championship
 1978 -  Chorzów, Silesian Stadium (with Malcolm Simmons) - Winner - 24pts (9)

World Team Cup
 1978 -  Landshut, Ellermühle Stadium (with Malcolm Simmons / Dave Jessup / Peter Collins / Michael Lee) - 2nd - 27pts (3)
 1981 -  Olching, Speedway Stadion Olching (with Dave Jessup / Chris Morton / Kenny Carter / John Davis) - 2nd - 29pts (1)

References

1953 births
Living people
British speedway riders
English motorcycle racers
Speedway World Pairs Champions
Eastbourne Eagles riders
Oxford Cheetahs riders
White City Rebels riders
Wimbledon Dons riders
King's Lynn Stars riders
Milton Keynes Knights riders
Exeter Falcons riders
Wolverhampton Wolves riders